The Moto E6 (stylized by Motorola as moto e6) is the 6th generation of the low-end Moto E family of Android smartphones developed by Motorola Mobility.

Submodels comparison

References 

Android (operating system) devices

Motorola smartphones
Mobile phones with user-replaceable battery
Mobile phones with multiple rear cameras